is a 2010 Japanese erotic comedy-drama film directed by Kōta Yoshida.

Cast
Noriko Eguchi as Yuriko
Shōta Sometani
Saori Hara
Noriko Kijima
Jun Miho

Reception
Tom Mes of Midnight Eye called the film "sexy as sin ... watchable and entertaining", and wrote that "Yoshida's handling of the material is impressive."

References

External links

2010s erotic drama films
Japanese erotic drama films
Films directed by Kōta Yoshida
Japanese comedy-drama films
Japanese sex comedy films
2010 comedy-drama films
2010 films
2010s Japanese films